Predatory mortgage securitization (predatory securitization) is any mortgage securitization products created with lax underwriting standards and improper due diligence. 

A book titled The Crime of Our Time by author Danny Schechter delves deeply into the predatory securitization process and the financial collapse of 2007.

References

Mortgage
Mortgage industry of the United States
Consumer fraud
Abuse
Deception
Ethically disputed business practices
Usury